Devaruppula is a village and a mandal in  Jangaon district in the state of Telangana in India.

References

Villages in Jangaon district
Mandals in Jangaon district